FC Shakhtar-3 Donetsk was a Ukrainian football team based in Donetsk, Ukraine. The team competed in the Ukrainian Second Division, and was considered the 3rd squad team or junior team from the FC Shakhtar Donetsk franchise.

History
Like most tributary teams, the best players are sent up to the senior team or reserve team that competes in the Premier Reserve League. Meanwhile, developing other junior players for further call-ups. The team consists of Shakhtar's players whose average age is less than 20—In essence the club's future. The players usually progress to this team through the Shakhtar Donetsk youth system. Shakhtar-3 train alongside the first and youth teams at Kirsha Training Centre

After the 2014–15 season the club management commented to the media on the rumors of termination Shakhtar-3 Donetsk after the season and confirmed that decision.

League and cup history
{|class="wikitable"
|-bgcolor="#efefef"
! Season
! Div.
! Pos.
! Pl.
! W
! D
! L
! GS
! GA
! P
!Domestic Cup
!colspan=2|Europe
!Notes
|-
|align=center|2000–01
|align=center|3rd "C"
|align=center|8
|align=center|30
|align=center|11
|align=center|7
|align=center|12
|align=center|32
|align=center|38
|align=center|40
|align=center|1/16 finalsSecond League Cup
|align=center|
|align=center|
|align=center|
|-
|align=center|2001–02
|align=center|3rd "C"
|align=center|7
|align=center|34
|align=center|17
|align=center|4
|align=center|13
|align=center|53
|align=center|40
|align=center|55
|align=center|
|align=center|
|align=center|
|align=center|
|-
|align=center|2002–03
|align=center|3rd "C"
|align=center|4
|align=center|28
|align=center|17
|align=center|6
|align=center|5
|align=center|37
|align=center|22
|align=center|57
|align=center|
|align=center|
|align=center|
|align=center|
|-
|align=center|2003–04
|align=center|3rd "C"
|align=center|4
|align=center|30
|align=center|18
|align=center|1
|align=center|11
|align=center|55
|align=center|36
|align=center|55
|align=center|
|align=center|
|align=center|
|align=center|
|-
|align=center|2004–05
|align=center|3rd "C"
|align=center|12
|align=center|28
|align=center|7
|align=center|5
|align=center|16
|align=center|35
|align=center|55
|align=center|26
|align=center|
|align=center|
|align=center|
|align=center|
|-
|align=center|2005–06
|align=center|3rd "C"
|align=center|11
|align=center|24
|align=center|8
|align=center|2
|align=center|14
|align=center|32
|align=center|38
|align=center|26
|align=center|
|align=center|
|align=center|
|align=center|
|-
|align=center|2006–07
|align=center|3rd "B"
|align=center|8
|align=center|28
|align=center|10
|align=center|6
|align=center|12
|align=center|42
|align=center|50
|align=center|36
|align=center|
|align=center|
|align=center|
|align=center|
|-
|align=center|2007–08
|align=center|3rd "B"
|align=center|7
|align=center|34
|align=center|15
|align=center|8
|align=center|11
|align=center|57
|align=center|50
|align=center|53
|align=center|
|align=center|
|align=center|
|align=center|
|-
|align=center|2008–09
|align=center|3rd "B"
|align=center|5
|align=center|34
|align=center|17
|align=center|7
|align=center|10
|align=center|66
|align=center|40
|align=center|58
|align=center|
|align=center|
|align=center|
|align=center|
|-
|align=center|2009–10
|align=center|3rd "B"
|align=center|7
|align=center|26
|align=center|10
|align=center|6
|align=center|10
|align=center|33
|align=center|29
|align=center|36
|align=center|
|align=center|
|align=center|
|align=center|
|-
|align=center|2010–11
|align=center|3rd "B"
|align=center|7
|align=center|22
|align=center|8
|align=center|5
|align=center|9
|align=center|38
|align=center|27
|align=center|29
|align=center|
|align=center|
|align=center|
|align=center|
|-
|align=center|2011–12
|align=center|3rd "B"
|align=center|8
|align=center|26
|align=center|10
|align=center|1
|align=center|15
|align=center|45
|align=center|56
|align=center|31
|align=center|
|align=center|
|align=center|
|align=center|
|- 
|align=center rowspan="2"|2012–13
|align=center|3rd "B"
|align=center|2
|align=center|24 	
|align=center|15 	
|align=center|3 	
|align=center|6 	
|align=center|57 	
|align=center|22 	 	
|align=center|48
|align=center|
|align=center|
|align=center|
|align=center|
|- 
|align=center|3rd "2"
|align=center|3
|align=center|34 		
|align=center|20 		
|align=center|5 		
|align=center|9 	
|align=center|72 		
|align=center|37 	
|align=center|65
|align=center|
|align=center|
|align=center|
|align=center|Stage 2
|-
|align=center|2013–14
|align=center|3rd 
|align=center|10
|align=center|35 
|align=center|16  
|align=center|2 
|align=center|17  
|align=center|47
|align=center|50   
|align=center|50
|align=center|
|align=center|
|align=center|
|align=center|
|-
|align=center|2014–15
|align=center|3rd 
|align=center|7
|align=center|27 	
|align=center|8 	
|align=center|6 	
|align=center|13 	
|align=center|38 	
|align=center|44
|align=center|30
|align=center|
|align=center|
|align=center|
|align=center bgcolor=pink|Withdrew 
|}

Coaches
 2000–2002 Viktor Hrachov
 2001 Yuriy Hulyayev
 2003–2005 Yevhen Yarovenko
 2005–2006 Ihor Dybchenko
 2006–2008 Ihor Leonov
 2007 Serhiy Popov
 2008–2009 Valeriy Rudakov
 2009–2013 Serhiy Kovalyov
 2010–2013 Oleksandr Funderat
 2013–2015 Valeriy Rudakov

Notes

External links 
 https://web.archive.org/web/20110716050313/http://academy.shakhtar.com/en/team/u19/ Shakhtar-3 Donetsk Section on Official Club Academy Website

 
FC Shakhtar Donetsk
Association football clubs established in 2000
Association football clubs disestablished in 2015
Defunct football clubs in Ukraine
Ukrainian reserve football teams
Football clubs in Donetsk
2000 establishments in Ukraine
2015 disestablishments in Ukraine